is a yaoi manga series written and illustrated by Maki Murakami. The story follows the attempts of Shuichi Shindo and his band, Bad Luck, to become Japan's next musical sensation, and his struggles to capture Eiri Yuki's heart.

The manga was published by Gentosha and was serialized on Kimi to Boku starting in 1996 and ending in 2002. The manga has been licensed and published in English by Tokyopop, as well as a light novel. There is also the Gravitation Collection which consists of 6 volumes, each of which has two original volumes of Gravitation in it. A sequel, was published in the web magazine Genzo from 2004 to 2009 and returned in 2011 to Web Spica.

Gravitation has also been adapted into a two episode OVA series in 1999 directed by Shinichi Watanabe and a thirteen-episode anime television series directed by Bob Shirohata. The TV series aired in Japan from October 4, 2000 to January 10, 2001, on WOWOW Wednesdays at 18:30 and was reaired on Tokyo MX in 2007. The anime goes to roughly volume 7 of the manga. Both have been licensed for North American release by Nozomi Entertainment.

Plot

The story surrounds an aspiring singer, Shuichi Shindou, and his band, Bad Luck (formed with his best friend Hiroshi Nakano, who is on guitar). Shuichi wants to become Japan's next big star, and follow in the footsteps of the famous idol Ryuichi Sakuma, lead singer of the now-disbanded legendary group Nittle Grasper. One evening, Shuichi is looking over lyrics for a song he was writing when his paper is blown away by the wind and picked up by a tall, blond haired (light brown in the manga) stranger. The man dismisses Shuichi's hard work as garbage, which hurts Shuichi deeply. Despite his anger, he is intrigued by the stranger. This will be their first encounter as Shuichi becomes fascinated by the stranger, who soon turns out to be the famous romance novelist, Eiri Yuki (real name: Uesugi). Both the manga and the anime follow this plot.

Gravitation EX.
The story picks up directly after volume 12; Shuichi and Eiri find and agree to momentarily take care of Yuki Kitazawa's son, Riku. Shuichi kisses and conducts a short affair with Ryuichi Sakuma, who announces that he is always been in love with Shuichi. Eiri is in a car accident that causes him to temporarily lose his eyesight, and Reiji announces that she's making all that has happened into a movie. Shuichi believes that this movie is the reason Ryuichi "pretended" to go after him, although Ryuichi's true motives remain unknown.

Development
The precursor to the Gravitation manga was a dōjinshi series titled Help!, which followed a similar story line but cast the characters in slightly different roles.

Murakami went to New York to research for a storyline later in Gravitation where the characters visit the city.

Murakami has created dōjinshi based on Gravitation which she describes as "pretty hard-core, adult stuff. Remix is softcore and Megamix is much more hardcore." She created the dōjinshi to explore tensions between the characters. Murakami penned a thirteen volume dōjinshi series called Gravitation Remix under the group Crocodile Ave. The dōjinshi are much more sexually explicit than the anime and deviate heavily from the manga storyline. Fans have requested that Tokyopop license Gravitation Remix, but Tokyopop regards the depiction of some characters to be too young and is concerned about themes of incest, and therefore has not licensed them.

In addition to the remixes, Murakami created four highly sexually explicit "Megamix" dōjinshi, dubbed Mega-gra, Megamix: Panda, Megamix: Kumagorou, and Megamix: Capybara. These also deviate from the storyline as the Remixes do, with Panda including shota content. A new Megamix is currently in the works, entitled Megamix Zebra. Megamix Zebra will feature Shuichi, Ryuichi, and Eiri in a threesome, with Shuichi as the seme.

Media

Manga

Written and illustrated by Maki Murakami, the manga was serialized in Gentosha's Kimi to Boku magazine between 1996 and 2002. Initially, a total of eleven tankōbon volumes were released by Sony Magazines between March 7, 1996, and December 25, 2000. Gentosha started to republish the series on April 24, 2002, concluding with the twelfth on August 24, 2002. A  was released by Gentosha between April 25, and September 22, 2006.

Tokyopop licensed the series for an English-language release in North America and published the twelve volumes from August 5, 2003 to July 12, 2005. Tokyopop also released the series in six compilation volumes in 2009–10. Madman Entertainment distributes the series in New Zealand and Australia.

A sequel to the series, Gravitation EX., started to be serialized in Japanese and English in the online magazine Web Comic Genzo. The first volume was published simultaneously by Gentosha and Tokyopop on February 24, 2007. Madman Entertainment also distributed the series in New Zealand and Australia. In the March 2009 issue, Murakami put the series on hiatus; Murakami resumed the series on June 28, 2011 in Gentosha's online magazine Web Spica. The second volume was published on November 24, 2011.

On May 28, 2014 Murakami published a one-shot based on Gravitation titled , which was followed by a series of the same name on July 28 in Web Spica.

Anime

OVA
A two-part OVA adaptation was created by Plum, Animate Film, SPE Visual Works, Sony Magazines and Movic. The first episode was released on July 23, 1999 and the second was released on September 22, 1999. It used the opening theme "Blind Game Again" and the ending theme "Smashing Blue" with the lyrics, composition and arrangement done by Mad Soldiers and sung By Kinya Kotani. There is 3 insert songs, which Part 1 had one called "Spicy Marmalade", the lyrics, composition and arrangement done by Mad Soldiers and sung by Kinya Kotani. Part 2 had two, the first one "In the Moonlight" with the lyrics, composition and arrangement done by Mad Soldiers and sung By Kinya Kotani and the second "Shining Collection" with the lyrics, composition and arrangement and sung by Iceman. The series was released in North America on DVD by Nozomi Entertainment in 2005 under the name Gravitation: Lyrics of Love.

TV series
An anime television series adaptation was produced by Studio Deen, SME Visual Works and Sony Magazines and directed by Bob Shirohata. The opening and closing themes to the TV series are "Super Drive'" and "Glaring Dream", performed respectively by Yosuke Sakanoue and Kinya Kotani. The series was released in North America on DVD by Nozomi Entertainment in 2004.

Drama CDs
Eight audio dramas were produced for Gravitation, featuring most of the voice actors of the TV and OVA series. Five retell events from the manga series, while the remaining three cover new story material. The drama CDs also contain musical tracks performed by the Japanese voice actors.

Other books
There are two novels based on Gravitation. The first one, released on November 30, 2000, follows the storyline for the OVA's. A second novel of Gravitation called  was written by Jun Lennon and released on September 30, 2002; it follows Shuichi as he goes on a chase throughout Japan to find the kidnapped Yuki. Both were published in North America by Tokyopop. The first was published on March 7, 2006 and the second was published on July 11, 2006 under the name Gravitation: voice of temptation. The both novels were remade into shinsō-ban edition and published on February 24, 2007.

Two  were released by Sony Magazines: the first was published on March 2, 1998, and the second one was published on August 7, 2000. Additionally, a fan book on the anime series was released on March 15, 2001.

Reception

Almost half a million copies of the Gravitation manga have been sold from its North American release from 2003 to 2007, and in 2005 it was the top manga on BookScan with BL themes. Rachel Woods notes that even a milder shōnen-ai manga "relies on sexual innuendo, comic double entendres, and coded visual references in order to maintain an erotic undercurrent that is not sexually explicit in nature", and discusses a page from Gravitation which shows the characters kissing, but using "fragmented panels" which show Yuki's "wandering hand" to provide a "tantalizing and suggestive imagery" that encourages the reader's imagination.

References

Further reading

External links
Official Gentosha website  
Official Sony Music Homepage 
Official Aniplex Homepage 
Official AT-X OVA website 
Official AT-X TV series Website 
Official Tokyo MX website  

1996 manga
1999 anime OVAs
2000 anime television series debuts
2000 Japanese television series debuts
2001 Japanese television series endings
2004 manga
Aniplex franchises
Gentosha manga
Japanese LGBT-related animated television series
Madman Entertainment anime
Madman Entertainment manga
Medialink
Music in anime and manga
Romance anime and manga
Shōjo manga
Studio Deen
Tokyo MX original programming
Tokyopop titles
Wowow original programming
Yaoi anime and manga
1990s LGBT literature
2000s Japanese LGBT-related television series